Michael Gorman (December 1816 – April 1, 1899) was a member of the Wisconsin State Assembly.

Gorman was born in County Kildare, Ireland in 1816. In 1844, he married Catherine Smith. They had nine children before her death on January 22, 1890. In 1856, Gorman settled on what became his farm in Lebanon, Waupaca County, Wisconsin.

Gorman was elected to the Assembly in 1872. He was a Democrat.

References

Politicians from County Kildare
Irish emigrants to the United States (before 1923)
People from Waupaca County, Wisconsin
Democratic Party members of the Wisconsin State Assembly
19th-century Roman Catholics
Farmers from Wisconsin
1816 births
1899 deaths
19th-century American politicians